Dennico Ashante Wellman Hollis (born 17 August 1988) is a cricketer who has played one One Day International for Bermuda. Currently playing Stenhousemuir Cricket Club in Scotland one of the most successful  clubs in Scotland.He quoted “I love this club and it’s home for me now. I wouldn’t want to play with any other club”. Within the 2021 season, he scored over 400 runs in all competitions. Taking 15 wickets with the ball too. At the start of the 2022 season, Hollis was a keen advocate for DRS to be introduced into Scottish club cricket after yet another season of questionable LBW decision the year before.

In May 2022, he was named in Bermuda's side for the 2022 Uganda Cricket World Cup Challenge League B tournament.

References

External links 

1988 births
Living people
Bermuda One Day International cricketers
Bermudian cricketers